Susan K. Fagan (born December 18, 1947) is an American politician from Washington. Fagan is a former Republican member of the Washington House of Representatives from District 9.

Early life 
On December 18, 1947, Fagan was born in Seattle, Washington.

Education 
Fagan earned a Bachelor of Science degree in Business Management from Lewis-Clark State College.

Career 
Following the death of Rep. Steven Hailey, on November 3, 2009, Fagan won the special election and became a Republican member of Washington House of Representatives for District 9, Position 1.

On November 2, 2010, as an incumbent, Fagan won the election unopposed and continued serving as a member of Washington House of Representatives for District 9, Position 1.

On November 6, 2012, as an incumbent, Fagan won the election unopposed and continued serving as a member of Washington House of Representatives for District 9, Position 1.

On November 4, 2014, as an incumbent, Fagan won the election unopposed and continued serving as a member of Washington House of Representatives for District 9, Position 1.

On Friday, May 1, 2015 Fagan resigned as a member of Washington House of Representatives, following allegations of falsified travel expense forms and pressured her assistants to help with the fraud.

Awards 
 2014 Guardians of Small Business award. Presented by NFIB.

Personal life 
Fagan's husband was John Fagan. They have five children. Fagan and her family live in Pullman, Washington.

References

External links 
 Susan Fagan at ballotpedia.org
 children san Fagan at ourcampaigns.com

1947 births
Living people
Republican Party members of the Washington House of Representatives
Women state legislators in Washington (state)
21st-century American women